The index of physics articles is split into multiple pages due to its size.

To navigate by individual letter use the table of contents below.

P

P-adic quantum mechanics
P-factor
P-form electrodynamics
P-nuclei
P-process
P-type semiconductor
P-wave
P-wave modulus
P. Buford Price
P3M
PACER (fusion)
PANDA experiment
PAR thrust
PEPS effect
PETRA
PGM-19 Jupiter
PHENIX
PHOBOS experiment
PHOSFOS
PICASSO
PIND
PITZ
PLATYPUS
PLUTO reactor
PM3 (chemistry)
POLYGON experiment
POVM
PQS (chemical)
PS210 experiment
PSR B1828-10
PSR B1913+16
PSR J0737-3039
PSR J1614–2230
PUREX
PVLAS
PVT (physics)
PWscf
PYTHIA
Padma Kant Shukla
Padre Bancalari
Painlevé paradox
Pair-instability supernova
Pair annihilation
Pair distribution function
Pair potential
Pair production
Pake doublet
Pakistan Institute of Nuclear Science and Technology
Pakistan Physics Society
Panayotis Varotsos
Pandemonium effect
Panemone windmill
Panofsky Prize
Pantur Silaban
Paolo Casati
Papaloizou–Pringle instability
Papapetrou–Dixon equations
Papkovich–Neuber solution
Parabolic trajectory
Parabolic trough
Parachor
Paracrystalline
Paraelectricity
Parafoil
Paraformer
Parallax barrier
Parallel Worlds (book)
Parallel axis theorem
Parallelogram of force
Paramagnetism
Parameterized post-Newtonian formalism
Parametric array
Parametric oscillator
Parametric resonance
Parasitic drag
Parastatistics
Parawing
Paraxial approximation
Parfocal lens
Parhelic circle
Paris' law
Pariser–Parr–Pople method
Parity (physics)
Parity anomaly
Parker Variable Wing
Parker spiral
Parney Albright
Parry arc
Parry–Daniels map
Parson magneton
Partial pressure
Partial wave analysis
Particle
Particle-in-cell
Particle-induced X-ray emission
Particle-size analysis
Particle-size distribution
Particle (disambiguation)
Particle Data Group
Particle acceleration
Particle accelerator
Particle aggregation
Particle astrophysics
Particle beam
Particle counter
Particle decay
Particle detector
Particle displacement
Particle experiments at Kolar Gold Fields
Particle horizon
Particle identification
Particle image velocimetry
Particle in a box
Particle in a one-dimensional lattice
Particle in a ring
Particle in a spherically symmetric potential
Particle number
Particle number operator
Particle physics
Particle physics and representation theory
Particle physics in cosmology
Particle radiation
Particle segregation
Particle shower
Particle size
Particle size (general)
Particle statistics
Particle tracking velocimetry
Particle velocity
Particle velocity level
Particle zoo
Particulates
Partition function (quantum field theory)
Partition function (statistical mechanics)
Parton (particle physics)
Parton distribution function
Parvez Butt
Parviz Moin
Pascal's barrel
Pascal's law
Pascal (unit)
Paschen's law
Paschen series
Paschen–Back effect
Pascual Jordan
Pasotron
Passive Underwater Fire Control Feasibility System
Passive radiator
Patch dynamics (physics)
Path-ordering
Path integral Monte Carlo
Path integral formulation
Path integral molecular dynamics
Pati–Salam model
Patricia Lewis (physicist)
Patrick Blackett, Baron Blackett
Patrick N. Keating
Patrick Tabeling
Patrick d'Arcy
Patterson function
Paul-Quentin Desains
Paul A. Fleury
Paul Alfred Biefeld
Paul Auguste Ernest Laugier
Paul Callaghan
Paul Chaikin
Paul Chun (professor)
Paul Corkum
Paul Davies
Paul Dirac
Paul Drude
Paul E. Klopsteg
Paul Ehrenfest
Paul Erman
Paul Fillunger
Paul Flory
Paul Frampton
Paul G. Hewitt
Paul G. Richards
Paul Garabedian
Paul Gerber
Paul Ginsparg
Paul Halpern
Paul Harteck
Paul Horowitz
Paul John Ellis
Paul Kunz
Paul Langevin
Paul Lauterbur
Paul M. Doty
Paul Mackenzie
Paul McEuen
Paul Moskowitz
Paul Nemenyi
Paul O. Müller
Paul Painlevé
Paul Palmer (physicist)
Paul Peter Ewald
Paul Richard Heinrich Blasius
Paul Rudolph (physicist)
Paul Scherrer
Paul Scherrer Institute
Paul Sophus Epstein
Paul Steinhardt
Paul Suni
Paul Taunton Matthews
Paul Townsend
Paul Ulrich Villard
Paul Weiss (nanoscientist)
Pauli equation
Pauli exclusion principle
Pauli group
Pauli matrices
Pauline Morrow Austin
Pauli–Villars regularization
Pavel Cherenkov
Pavel Jelínek
Pavel Petrovich Parenago
Pavle Savić
Pawsey Medal
Payload for Antimatter Matter Exploration and Light-nuclei Astrophysics
Peak expiratory flow
Peak kilovoltage
Peak signal-to-noise ratio
Peakon
Pearl vortex
Peccei–Quinn theory
Peculiar motion
Peculiar velocity
Peder Oluf Pedersen
Pedro Paulet
Peierls bracket
Peixoto's theorem
Pelindaba
Pelletron
Pencil (optics)
Pendulum
Pendulum day
Pendulum rocket fallacy
Peng Huanwu
Penguin diagram
Penning mixture
Penning trap
Penrose criterion
Penrose diagram
Penrose graphical notation
Penrose interpretation
Penrose process
Penrose transform
Penrose–Hawking singularity theorems
Pentamirror
Pentaprism
Pentaquark
Per-Olov Löwdin
Per Arne Rikvold
Per Bak
Per Carlqvist
Percentage of the speed of light
Percolation
Percolation critical exponents
Percolation theory
Percolation threshold
Percus–Yevick approximation
Percy Williams Bridgman
Peregrine soliton
Perfect Cosmological Principle
Perfect conductor
Perfect fluid
Perfect gas
Perfect lens
Perfect mirror
Perfectly Reasonable Deviations from the Beaten Track
Perhapsatron
Perifocal coordinate system
Perigean spring tide
Perimeter Institute for Theoretical Physics
Period-doubling bifurcation
Period 9 element
Periodic poling
Periodic table
Periodicity (metamaterials)
Periodogram
Perley Ason Ross
Perley G. Nutting
Perlin noise
Permeability (electromagnetism)
Permeability constant
Permeameter
Permeance
Permeation
Permittivity
Perovskite (structure)
Perpendicular axis theorem
Perpetual motion
Perpetual motion machine
Perrin friction factors
Persis Drell
Persistence length
Person-rem/year
Perturbation theory
Perturbation theory (quantum mechanics)
Perturbative QCD
Perveance
Pervez Hoodbhoy
Peskin–Takeuchi parameter
Peter A. Sturrock
Peter A. Wolff
Peter Armbruster
Peter B. Lyons
Peter Barham
Peter Bergmann
Peter C. Aichelburg
Peter Coles
Peter Collinson (botanist)
Peter Coveney
Peter D. Jarvis
Peter Debye
Peter Demos
Peter Dollond
Peter Edwards (chemist)
Peter Fowler (physicist)
Peter Franken
Peter Freund
Peter Galison
Peter Goddard (physicist)
Peter Goldreich
Peter Grünberg
Peter Guthrie Tait
Peter Haynes (mathematician)
Peter Herbert Jensen
Peter Heszler
Peter Higgs
Peter Hirsch
Peter Huybers
Peter Hänggi
Peter Knight (scientist)
Peter Kramer (physicist)
Peter Lax
Peter Littlewood
Peter Lu
Peter Mansfield
Peter Mazur
Peter Pershan
Peter Smith (physicist)
Peter Stilbs
Peter Thejll
Peter V. E. McClintock
Peter Wadhams
Peter Westervelt
Peter Woit
Peter Zimmerman
Peter Zoller
Peter van Nieuwenhuizen
Petr Beckmann
Petr Hořava (theorist)
Petr Paucek
Petr Vaníček
Petrophysics
Petrov classification
Petrus Peregrinus de Maricourt
Petzval field curvature
Pfeiffer Effect
Pfund series
Phantom energy
Phase-coherent holography
Phase-contrast imaging
Phase (matter)
Phase (waves)
Phase Noise
Phase compensation
Phase contrast microscope
Phase contrast microscopy
Phase distortion
Phase factor
Phase noise
Phase offset modulation
Phase plane
Phase portrait
Phase problem
Phase retrieval
Phase space
Phase space formulation
Phase switch
Phase transition
Phase velocities
Phase velocity
Phased-array optics
Phased array
Phased array ultrasonics
Phenomenology (particle physics)
Phi meson
Phil Williams (Welsh politician)
Philip Abelson
Philip Beckley
Philip Burton Moon
Philip Dee
Philip J. Dolan
Philip J. Morrison
Philip L. Roe
Philip M. Morse
Philip Morrison
Philip Russell (physicist)
Philip Saffman
Philip Warren Anderson
Philipp Carl
Philipp Lenard
Philipp von Jolly
Philippe Guyot-Sionnest
Philippe Nozières
Philippine Nuclear Research Institute
Philo of Byzantium
Philolaus
Philosophical Magazine
Philosophical Transactions of the Royal Society A
Philosophical interpretation of classical physics
Philosophiæ Naturalis Principia Mathematica
Philosophy of physics
Philosophy of space and time
Philosophy of thermal and statistical physics
Phobos (experiment)
Phon
Phonomotor
Phonon
Phonon drag
Phonon noise
Phononic crystal
Phosphor
Phosphor thermometry
Phosphorescence
Phosphoroscope
Phoswich detector
Phot
Phot. Nano. Fund. Appl.
Phot Nano Fund Appl
Photo-Carnot engine
Photo-Dember
Photobleaching
Photochromic lens
Photoconduction
Photoconductive atomic force microscopy
Photoconductivity
Photodetector
Photodisintegration
Photodissociation
Photoelastic modulator
Photoelasticity
Photoelectric effect
Photoelectric efficiency
Photoelectric sensor
Photoelectrochemical processes
Photoemission spectroscopy
Photoexcitation
Photofission
Photographic lens design
Photographic magnitude
Photographic plate
Photoinduced charge separation
Photoinduced phase transitions
Photoionisation
Photoionisation cross section
Photolithography
Photoluminescence
Photomagnetic effect
Photomagnetism
Photomagneton
Photometer
Photometric redshift
Photometry (optics)
Photomixing
Photomultiplier
Photon
Photon-in-photon-out
Photon-intermediate direct energy conversion
Photon Doppler velocimetry
Photon Factory
Photon diffusion
Photon entanglement
Photon epoch
Photon gas
Photon induced electric field poling
Photon noise
Photon polarization
Photon sphere
Photonic-crystal fiber
Photonic crystal
Photonic integrated circuit
Photonic metamaterial
Photonics
Photonics Letters of Poland
Photonics Society of Poland
Photonics and Nanostructures
Photonics and Nanostructures: Fundamentals and Applications
Photophoresis
Photorefractive effect
Photoresist
Photosensitive glass
Photosensitizer
Photothermal effect
Photothermal optical microscopy
Photothermal spectroscopy
Photovoltaic effect
Photovoltaics
Phugoid
Phun
Phyllis S. Freier
Phys.Org
Physica (journal)
Physica A
Physica B
Physica C
Physica D
Physica E
Physica Scripta
Physica Status Solidi
Physica Status Solidi A
Physica Status Solidi B
Physica Status Solidi C
Physica Status Solidi RRL
Physical Biology
Physical Chemistry Chemical Physics
Physical Review
Physical Review A
Physical Review A: General Physics
Physical Review E
Physical Review Focus
Physical Review Letters
Physical Science Study Committee
Physical Society of Japan
Physical Society of London
Physical acoustics
Physical body
Physical constant
Physical cosmology
Physical geodesy
Physical law
Physical objects
Physical optics
Physical paradox
Physical phenomenon
Physical property
Physical quantity
Physical Review E: Statistical Physics, Plasmas, Fluids, and Related Interdisciplinary Topics
Physical strength
Physical substance
Physical system
Physical theories modified by general relativity
Physicist
Physicist and Christian
Physics
PhysicsWeb
Physics (American Physical Society journal)
Physics Abstracts
Physics Abstracts. Science Abstracts. Series A
Physics Abstracts - Series A
Physics Abstracts - Series A: Science Abstracts
Physics Abstracts Series A
Physics Analysis Workstation
Physics Education
Physics Letters
Physics Letters A
Physics Letters B
Physics Reports
Physics Today
Physics and Astronomy Classification Scheme
Physics and Chemistry of Liquids
Physics and Chemistry of Minerals
Physics and Star Trek
Physics and engineering explorations
Physics beyond the Standard Model
Physics education
Physics envy
Physics equations
Physics in Medicine and Biology
Physics in medieval Islam
Physics of Fluids
Physics of Life Reviews
Physics of Plasmas
Physics of computation
Physics of firearms
Physics of glass
Physics of skiing
Physics of the Impossible
Physics of the Solid State
Physics Today
Physikalisch-Technische Bundesanstalt
Physikalische Blätter
Physikalische Zeitschrift
Pi Josephson junction
Piara Singh Gill
Picard horn
Picarin
Picotechnology
Picture (string theory)
Piermaria Oddone
Piero Giorgio Bordoni
Pierre-Gilles de Gennes
Pierre-Michel Duffieux
Pierre-Simon Laplace
Pierre Aigrain
Pierre Angénieux
Pierre Auger Observatory
Pierre Bertholon de Saint-Lazare
Pierre Bouguer
Pierre Curie
Pierre Goldschmidt
Pierre Henri Hugoniot
Pierre Hohenberg
Pierre Louis Dulong
Pierre Louis Maupertuis
Pierre Perrault (scientist)
Pierre Polinière
Pierre Prévost
Pierre Ramond
Pierre Victor Auger
Pierre Weiss
Pierson–Moskowitz spectrum
Pieter Kok
Pieter Rijke
Pieter Zeeman
Pieter van Musschenbroek
Piezoelectric coefficient
Piezoelectricity
Piezoresistive effect
Piezoresponse force microscopy
Pilot wave
Pin group
Pinch (magnetic fusion)
Pinch (plasma physics)
Pincushion distortion
Pink noise
Pinning force
Piola-Kirchhoff stress tensor
Pion
Pion decay constant
Pioneer anomaly
Pionium
Pipe flow
Pipe network analysis
Pis'ma v Astronomicheskii Zhurnal
Piston (optics)
Pit (nuclear weapon)
Pitch-up
Pitch drop experiment
Pitching moment
Pitot tube
Piyare Jain
Planar array radar
Planar laser-induced fluorescence
Planck's law
Planck (spacecraft)
Planck angular frequency
Planck charge
Planck constant
Planck current
Planck density
Planck energy
Planck epoch
Planck force
Planck impedance
Planck length
Planck mass
Planck matter
Planck momentum
Planck particle
Planck postulate
Planck power
Planck pressure
Planck radiation
Planck scale
Planck temperature
Planck time
Planck units
Planck voltage
Plane mirror
Plane of incidence
Plane of reference
Plane wave expansion method
PlanetPhysics
Planetarium hypothesis
Planetary and Space Science
Planetary nebula
Planetary nebula luminosity function
Planets beyond Neptune
Plasma (physics)
Plasma Physics Laboratory (Saskatchewan)
Plasma Science Society of India
Plasma Sources Science and Technology
Plasma acceleration
Plasma channel
Plasma cleaning
Plasma containment
Plasma cosmology
Plasma diagnostics
Plasma facing material
Plasma fountain
Plasma gasification
Plasma globe
Plasma lamp
Plasma modeling
Plasma oscillation
Plasma parameter
Plasma parameters
Plasma propulsion engine
Plasma recombination
Plasma scaling
Plasma source
Plasma speaker
Plasma stability
Plasma stealth
Plasma torch
Plasma weapon
Plasma window
Plasmaron
Plasmasphere
Plasmat lens
Plasmoid
Plasmon
Plasmonic cover
Plasmonic metamaterials
Plasmonic solar cell
Plastic-clad silica fiber
Plastic Fantastic: How the Biggest Fraud in Physics Shook the Scientific World
Plastic bending
Plastic deformation in solids
Plastic magnet
Plastic moment
Plasticity (physics)
Plastometer
Plate tectonics
Plateau–Rayleigh instability
Platinum Metals Review
Plato
Platteville Atmospheric Observatory
Plebanski action
Plekton
Pleuger rudder
Plug flow
Plum pudding model
Plume (hydrodynamics)
Plummer model
Plus minus method
Plutonium
Plutonium(IV) oxide
Plutonium-238
Plutonium-239
Pneumatic barrier
Pneumatic circuit
Pneumatic cylinder
Pneumatic flow control
Pneumatic motor
Pockels effect
Pohlmeyer charge
Poincaré Seminar
Poincaré Seminars
Poincaré group
Poincaré map
Poincaré recurrence theorem
Poincaré–Bendixson theorem
Poincaré–Lindstedt method
Poinsot's ellipsoid
Point charge
Point mass
Point particle
Point source
Point source (light)
Point spread function
Poise
Poisson's equation
Poisson's ratio
Poisson bracket
Poisson–Boltzmann equation
Pol Duwez
Pol Swings
Polar cyclone
Polar mesosphere summer echoes
Polar moment of inertia
Polar orbit
Polar vortex
Polar wander
Polar wind
Polarimetry
Polariton
Polariton superfluid
Polarity (disambiguation)
Polarizability
Polarizable vacuum
Polarization-division multiplexing
Polarization (waves)
Polarization density
Polarization in astronomy
Polarization mode dispersion
Polarization spectroscopy
Polarized target
Polarizer
Polaroid (polarizer)
Polaron
Polhode
Polyakov action
Polyamorphism
Polychromatic
Polychromator
Polykarp Kusch
Polymer Bulletin
Polymer physics
Polymer science
Polymer solar cell
Polymeric liquid crystal
Polyphase coil
Polyphase system
Polytrope
Polytropic process
Polywater
Polywell
Pomeranchuk Prize
Pomeron
Ponderomotive energy
Ponderomotive force
Pons-Fleischmann experiment
Pontecorvo–Maki–Nakagawa–Sakata matrix
Poole–Frenkel effect
Pople notation
Population I Cepheid
Population I Cepheids
Population inversion
Poromechanics
Pororoca
Portevin–Le Chatelier effect
Posidonius
Position and momentum space
Position operator
Position space
Positive displacement meter
Positive energy theorem
Positive pressure
Positron
Positron emission
Positron emission tomography
Positronium
Positronium hydride
Post-Hartree–Fock
Post-Newtonian expansion
Post Office Box (electricity)
Postulates of special relativity
Potassium titanyl phosphate
Potential
Potential difference
Potential energy
Potential energy surface
Potential flow
Potential gradient
Potential temperature
Potential theory
Potential vorticity
Potential well
Potentiometric surface
Potsdam Denkschrift
Potts model
Poul la Cour
Pound–Rebka experiment
Powder-in-tube
Powder diffraction
Power-law fluid
Power-law index profile
Power-to-weight ratio
Power (physics)
Power density
Power history
Power number
Power optimizer
Powered hang glider
Poynting's theorem
Poynting vector
Pp-wave spacetime
Prabhakar Misra
Prabhu Lal Bhatnagar
Pran Nath
Prandtl-Glauert method
Prandtl number
Prandtl–Glauert singularity
Prandtl–Glauert transformation
Prandtl–Meyer expansion fan
Prandtl–Meyer function
Praveen Chaudhari
Pre-echo
Pre-main-sequence star
Precession
Precision Array for Probing the Epoch of Reionization
Precision tests of QED
Predhiman Krishan Kaw
Predictability
Predrag Cvitanović
Preferential concentration
Preferred frame
Pregeometry (physics)
Premelting
Preon
Preon star
Present
Presentism (philosophy of time)
Pressure
Pressure-correction method
Pressure-fed engine (rocket)
Pressure-gradient force
Pressure-sensitive paint
Pressure coefficient
Pressure drop
Pressure exchanger
Pressure experiment
Pressure head
Pressure measurement
Pressure volume diagram
Press–Schechter formalism
Primakoff effect
Primary field
Primary flow element
Primitive cell
Primitive equations
Primon gas
Primordial black hole
Primordial isocurvature baryon model
Primordial nuclide
Primum Mobile
Princeton Plasma Physics Laboratory
Princeton ocean model
Principal axis (mechanics)
Principal quantum number
Principle of Calorimetry
Principle of corresponding states
Principle of inertia (physics)
Principle of least action
Principle of locality
Principle of material objectivity
Principle of maximum entropy
Principle of maximum work
Principle of minimum energy
Principle of relativity
Principles of Quantum Mechanics
Prism (optics)
Prism compressor
Probability amplitude
Probability current
Probing Lensing Anomalies Network
Proca action
Proceedings of SPIE
Proceedings of the Physical Society
Proceedings of the USSR Academy of Sciences
Process function
Prodicus
Prof. Eleftheriades
Professor Eleftheriades
Progress in Electromagnetics Research
Progress in Materials Science
Progress in Optics
Progress in Physics
Progress of Theoretical Physics
Progress of Theoretical Physics Supplement
Project Mohole
Project Tuva
Projectile motion
Projection method (fluid dynamics)
Projective superspace
Prompt critical
Prompt gamma neutron activation analysis
Prompt neutron
Prony equation
Propagation constant
Propagation delay
Propagator
Propellant mass fraction
Proper acceleration
Proper frame
Proper length
Proper motion
Proper orbital elements
Proper time
Proper velocity
Proportional counter
Propulsion
Propulsive efficiency
Prosper-René Blondlot
Protogalaxy
Proton
Proton-to-electron mass ratio
Proton Synchrotron
Proton Synchrotron Booster
Proton decay
Proton emission
Proton spin crisis
Protonium
Proton–gyromagnetic ratio
Proton–proton chain reaction
Protoplanetary nebula
Protostar
Proximity effect (atomic physics)
Proximity effect (audio)
Przybylski's Star
Pseudo-Anosov map
Pseudo-Euclidean space
Pseudo-Goldstone boson
Pseudo-Riemannian manifold
Pseudo Stirling cycle
Pseudogap
Pseudophakic photic phenomena
Pseudopotential
Pseudorapidity
Pseudoscalar
Pseudoscalar meson
Pseudotensor
Pseudovector
Pseudovector meson
Psi meson
Psychic determinism
Psychoacoustics
Psychrometrics
Ptychography
Pucadyil Ittoop John
Pulsar
Pulsar kicks
Pulsatile flow
Pulse (physics)
Pulse forming network
Pulse height analyzer
Pulsed EPR
Pulsed field gradient
Pulsed laser deposition
Pulsed power
Pulsometer steam pump
Pump
Pumplinx
Purcell effect
Purdue University Reactor Number One
Pure bending
Pure gauge
Pure shear
Pure spinor
Pure state
Purity (gas)
Purity (quantum mechanics)
Pwpaw
Pyotr Kapitsa
Pyotr Lebedev
Pyotr Valentinovich Trusov
Pyranometer
Pyrgeometer
Pyroelectric crystal
Pyroelectric fusion
Pyroelectricity
Pyrometer
Pyrometry
Pythagoras
Pythagorean hammers
Pål Brekke
Péclet number
P–n junction

Indexes of physics articles